The 1987 Los Angeles Rams season was the franchise's strike shortened 50th season in the National Football League, their 40th overall, and their 42nd in the Greater Los Angeles Area. The season saw the Rams attempting to improve on their 10-6 record from 1986 and make the playoffs for the 5th straight season. However, the Rams struggled right out the gate. In their first 2 games against the Houston Oilers and Minnesota Vikings, the Rams had 4th quarter leads and blew them. They led 13-0 in the 4th quarter at Houston and lost 20-16, while they led 16-14 at home against Minnesota and lost 21-16. The next week, a strike occurred which wiped out all week 3 games. As a result, their game at home against the Cincinnati Bengals was canceled. One week later, the Rams were thumped by the Saints 37-10 to start the season 0-3, their first such start since 1982, which was, ironically, also a season that saw a strike take place. The Rams finally got in the win column the next week, beating the Pittsburgh Steelers at home, 31-21. However, the next week in Atlanta, the Rams lost another big lead, this time after leading 17-0 at halftime and 20-7 in the 4th quarter. This was followed by embarrassing losses to the Cleveland Browns (30-17), the arch-rival San Francisco 49ers (31-10), and the Saints again (31-14) to drop to 1-7, their worst start since 1965, when they started 1-9. However, the Rams then caught fire, beating the St. Louis Cardinals in St. Louis, 27-24, after trailing 24-14 in the 3rd quarter. The next week in Washington, the Rams outlasted the Washington Redskins on Monday Night Football 30-26, and it appeared as though the Rams were poised to get back in the playoff race. The win over Washington was followed by blowout wins over the Tampa Bay Buccaneers (35-3), Detroit Lions (37-16), and Atlanta Falcons (33-0) and the Rams were looking to make an improbable in-season turnaround. However, the next week against the Dallas Cowboys, the Rams lost 29-21 to eliminate them from the playoffs. The season ended with the Rams getting pummeled by the 49ers on the road, 48-0. Ultimately, the Rams finished the strike-shortened season 6-9 and missed the playoffs for the first time since 1982.

Offseason

NFL draft

Personnel

Staff

NFL replacement players 
After the league decided to use replacement players during the NFLPA strike, the following team was assembled:

Roster

Regular season 
On October 31, 1987, the Los Angeles Rams traded Eric Dickerson to the Indianapolis Colts in a three team trade involving the Buffalo Bills. The Rams sent Dickerson to the Colts for six draft choices and two players. Buffalo obtained the rights to Cornelius Bennett from Indianapolis. Buffalo sent running back Greg Bell and three draft choices to the Rams, while Indianapolis added Owen Gill and three of their own draft picks to complete the deal with the Rams.

Former Heisman Trophy winner Charles White would become the starting running back. The 1987 season would be his finest year as a pro, rushing for a league-leading 1,387 yards and 11 touchdowns, which earned him a Pro Bowl selection and the NFL Comeback Player of the Year Award.

On November 23, 1987, linebacker Mike Wilcher recovered Doug Williams fumble and ran it back it 35 yards for a touchdown. It was Wilcher's only touchdown in the NFL.

Erik Kramer's 3 passing touchdown performance against the Rams on October 18, 1987, was the last three-touchdown game by an undrafted free agent rookie quarterback until Matt McGloin accomplished the feat for the Oakland Raiders on November 17, 2013, against the Houston Texans.

Schedule

Standings

Awards and honors 
 Jerry Gray, NFC Pro Bowl selection
 Charles White, NFL Comeback Player of the Year
 Charles White, Pro Bowl selection

See also 
Other Anaheim–based teams in 1987
 California Angels (Anaheim Stadium)
 1987 California Angels season

External links 
 1987 Los Angeles Rams at Pro-Football-Reference.com

References 

Los Angeles Rams
Los Angeles Rams seasons
Los Ang